The FIBA Basketball World Cup Most Valuable Player is an award, that is given by FIBA, to the Most Valuable Player of the FIBA Basketball World Cup. The inaugural award was handed out in 1950, to Oscar Furlong.

Winners

See also
 FIBA World Cup
 FIBA World Cup Top Scorer
 FIBA World Cup All-Tournament Team
 FIBA World Cup Records
 FIBA EuroBasket
 FIBA EuroBasket MVP
 FIBA EuroBasket Top Scorer
 FIBA EuroBasket All-Tournament Team
 FIBA EuroBasket Records
 FIBA Hall of Fame
 FIBA Order of Merit
 FIBA's 50 Greatest Players (1991)

References

External links

Records
Basketball trophies and awards